Harmica may refer to:

 Harmica, a settlement in Croatia, on the border with Slovenia
 Ban Jelačić Square, the main square of Zagreb, Croatia